Test of Time  may refer to:

Test of Time (1995 book)
 Civilization II: Test of Time
 Lindy effect